Tropical Storm Erin was a minimal tropical storm that made landfall in Texas in August 2007. The storm's remnants also unexpectedly restrengthened over Oklahoma, causing damage there as well. The second tropical cyclone to make landfall in the United States in the 2007 Atlantic hurricane season  and the fifth named storm of the year, Erin formed in the Gulf of Mexico on August 14 from a persistent area of convection. It attained tropical storm status the next day, and on August 16, 2007, Erin made landfall near Lamar, Texas, and persisted over land across Texas before moving northward into Oklahoma. Due to the brown ocean effect, Erin intensified after landfall. The storm resulted in sixteen fatalities and worsened an already-severe flooding issue in Texas.

Meteorological history 

On August 1, 2007, an area of convection developed just south of Jamaica in association with a trough of low pressure. The system tracked west-northwestward, and by August 10 consisted of a broad surface trough with minimal shower activity. Convection increased on August 11, and by August 12 the interaction between a tropical wave and an upper-level low in the area resulted in a large area of disorganized thunderstorms extending from the western Caribbean Sea into the central Bahamas. Late on August 14, a Hurricane Hunters flight into the system reported a small circulation center, but at the time was not well-defined enough to result in the initiation of tropical cyclone advisories.

In the overnight hours after formation, the storm was disorganized with a ragged and ill-defined center of circulation. Located to the south of a mid to upper-level ridge over the southern United States, the system tracked to the west-northwest through an environment conducive for further strengthening; an upper-level anticyclone developed over the central Gulf of Mexico, and sea surface temperatures along its track were warm. The cloud pattern became better organized, maintaining a large area of convection with curved rainbands and well-established outflow. As it continued northwestward, Erin remained disorganized and failed to strengthen beyond minimal tropical storm status. At 1200 UTC on August 16 the cyclone made landfall near Lamar, Texas as it weakened to tropical depression status. Three hours later, the National Hurricane Center ceased issuing advisories on Erin as warning responsibility was transferred to the Hydrometeorological Prediction Center.

Drifting northwestward through Texas, Tropical Depression Erin maintained an area of convection near the center, with its widespread but scattered rainbands dropping moderate to heavy precipitation. The system turned to the north-northeast on August 18, while heavy bands of thunderstorms continued to rotate around the center of Erin. Early on August 19 after entering Oklahoma, the remnants of Erin suddenly re-intensified to maximum sustained winds of  a short distance west of Oklahoma City. However, a few hours later, the depression began weakening again, and late on August 19 Erin weakened significantly as the circulation dissipated over northeastern Oklahoma. Despite displaying tropical characteristics, the National Hurricane Center determined the system was not a tropical cyclone over Oklahoma, and classified it as a "low". The low continued into southeastern Kansas before dissipating, feeding moisture northward toward a frontal system extending from the Midwestern United States through the Mid-Atlantic States. Its remnant mid-level circulation then moved eastward across Missouri, Kentucky, and Virginia before losing identity as it moved out into the Atlantic Ocean.

Preparations 

Immediately upon becoming a tropical cyclone, the National Hurricane Center issued a tropical storm watch from Freeport, Texas to the United States/Mexico border; at the same time, the government of Mexico issued a tropical storm watch southward to Rio San Fernando. Shortly before attaining tropical storm status, the watch in Texas was upgraded to a tropical storm warning. Late on August 15, the warning was extended to San Luis Pass, while the watch in Mexico was discontinued. As Erin made landfall, the warning was canceled, and several flood watches and warnings were issued for counties across southeastern Texas. Upon moving into Oklahoma, flood and flash flood warnings were issued for several counties.

Governor Rick Perry activated the National Guard and mobilized emergency personnel to the region expected to be affected by the storm. Erin was expected to bring flooding to the region, which had already been declared a disaster area on August 7, 2007, due to widespread flooding on the Nueces River basin; this area remained flooded as of August 15, 2007. On August 15, oil futures rose to $74.01 (USD), due to fears of Erin disrupting oil supplies produced on Texan coasts, combined with low oil inventories. As a result of the threat from the storm, Shell Oil Company evacuated 188 workers on oil platforms in the northwestern Gulf of Mexico.

Impact

Texas 

By midday on August 15, rainbands with gusty winds began affecting the Texas coastline. As it moved ashore, the storm produced heavy rainfall near and to the or northeast of its path, reaching  at a station in Lockwood. The storm caused several bayous in the Houston area to reach or exceed flood levels. Across southeastern Texas, the cyclone spawned several funnel clouds, and near IAH an EF0 tornado was reported.

In Clear Lake City, heavy rainfall collapsed a portion of a grocery store roof, killing one worker and one Coca-Cola merchandiser. The precipitation caused moderate flooding across eastern portions of Harris County; over 400 homes and 40 businesses were flooded. Flooding across the Greater Houston area briefly halted the METRORail and closed several state roads. One person drowned after driving into a retention pond. Several people required rescue assistance, and in Comal County a car accident caused three fatalities. The passage of the storm temporarily left about 20,000 electrical customers without power, though most outages were quickly restored. In San Antonio, one body was recovered from a creek and another died after driving into a flooded road and was swept into a drainage ditch in which four others survived. In Sisterdale, two people were killed when they were swept away stalled over Sister Creek. In Taylor County, near Abilene, flooding killed one person and forced the evacuation of about 2,000 people. Damage in Texas totaled over $45 million (2007 USD).

Oklahoma 

After its unexpected redevelopment over Oklahoma, widespread damage was also reported there. Several communities in central Oklahoma were flooded due to the heavy rainfall. Watonga, Kingfisher and Geary were the hardest-hit communities, where many houses and buildings were inundated. The weather forced the cancellation of the Hydro Fair as the carnival rides were not safe in heavy rain and high wind. The entire community lost power, as did about 15,000 customers in total in the Oklahoma City metropolitan area. A section of Interstate 40 was also closed for a while.

One person drowned in a cellar in Fort Cobb, and another drowned in Kingfisher. Another storm-related death took place in Seminole. Three others were found dead after a weather-related automobile accident also near Carnegie. Another automobile accident fatality took place in Okmulgee County but it is unclear if the event was storm-related. Damage amounted to over $2 million (2007 USD).

Missouri 
Although its surface circulation had dissipated, its circulation aloft remained intact and led to a burst of rainfall early on August 20. The 11.94 inches/303.3 mm that fell at Miller became the wettest Missouri rainfall total associated with a tropical cyclone, or its remains, since at least 1972. One person died in Sleeper when he drove into flood waters which had swept away a bridge he was attempting to navigate onto. Nine water rescues occurred along the I-44 corridor, mostly caused by Erin's rainfall. Damage totaled about $19.8 million (2007 USD) in the state, primarily in Polk County.

See also 

 2007 Midwest flooding
 Derecho
 Other storms of the same name
 Timeline of the 2007 Atlantic hurricane season
 Tropical Storm Bill (2015) - another storm that took the same general path, and was affected by the Brown ocean effect.
 Tropical Storm Imelda - yet another storm in 2019 that took the same general path and devastated Texas with severe flooding.

References

External links 

 See the NHC advisory archive on Tropical Storm Erin
 See the HPC advisory archive on Tropical Depression Erin

2007 Atlantic hurricane season
Atlantic tropical storms
Hurricanes in Texas
Houston hurricanes
Hurricanes in Oklahoma
Tropical Storm Erin
Erin